Esdras is a given name. Notable people with the name include:

 Esdras Alfred de St-Georges (1849–1890), Quebec lawyer, physician and political figure
 Esdras Minville (1896–1975), Quebec writer, economist and sociologist
 Esdras Padilla (born 1989), Honduran football player
 Esdras Rangel (born 1977), Mexican professional football goalkeeper
 Michel Esdras Bernier (1841–1921), Canadian politician